The Kiribati National Championship is the top division of competitive football in the nation of Kiribati, founded in 2002 by the Kiribati Islands Football Association, the nations football governing body. The association and the National Championships are based in the capital city, South Tarawa.
The competition reunites only temporary council teams (one council team on each island, two council teams on Tabiteuea and 3 teams on Tarawa) and is disputed during Te Runga, the National Games held every two years.

Champions in 2019

Kiribati National Championship – clubs (2014)

Pool A
Abaiang
Butaritari
Makin
Marakei
North Tarawa

Pool B
Aranuka
Betio Town Council (BTC)
Kuria
Maiana
 (TUC)

Pool C
Abemama
Banaba
Nonouti
Onotoa
Tabiteuea North

Pool D
Arorae
Beru
Nikunau
Tabiteuea South
Tamana

Pool E
Christmas Island
Tabuaeran
Teraina

Previous winners
Previous winners are:
1984: South Tarawa
1985–2001: not known (many years: not held)
2002: Arorae
2003: not held
2004: Teinainano Urban Council
2005: not held
2006: Betio Town Council
2007: not held
2008: not known
2009: Betio Town Council
2010: Makin
2011: not held
2012: not held
2013: Makin
2014: not known
2015: not held
2016: not held
2017: Nonouti
2018: not held 
2019: Betio Town Council
2020: not held (next Te Runga in 2023)

By titles

Topscorers

References

External links 

 Kiribati Football

1
Top level football leagues in Oceania
2002 establishments in Kiribati